Elizabeth Harvey is a British historian of 20th-century Germany.

Harvey  received her PhD in 1987 from the University of Oxford. Since 1987 she has held positions at the Universities of Salford, Dundee, Liverpool, and, more recently, Nottingham.

Books 

 Harvey, Elizabeth, and Johannes Hürter., eds.  Hitler - New Research. 2018. German yearbook of contemporary history, volume 3. De Gruyter Oldenbourg, [2018] 
 Harvey, Elizabeth. Women and the Nazi East: Agents and Witnesses of Germanization. New Haven, Conn: Yale University Press, 2003.
 Harvey, Elizabeth. Youth and the Welfare State in the Weimar Republic. Oxford: Clarendon, 1993.  
 Harvey, Elizabeth, Johannes Hürter, Maiken Umbach, and Andreas Wirsching, eds. . Private Life and Privacy in Nazi Germany. Cambridge: Cambridge University Press, 2019.
 Harvey, Elizabeth, and Lynn Abrams. Gender Relations in German History: Power, Agency, and Experience from the Sixteenth to the Twentieth Century. Durham: Duke University Press, 1997.

References 

British historians
British women historians
Alumni of the University of Oxford
Year of birth missing (living people)
Living people